Reverend John Robert Scott Sr. (1840-41 – February 18, 1929) was a religious and political leader in Florida as well as a college president. He was born into slavery in Virginia. During the Reconstruction era he became a pastor in the African Methodist Episcopal (A.M.E.) Church and a state legislator.

He was chosen in 1870 as the first pastor of St. Paul African Methodist Episcopal Church of Jacksonville, Florida. He also served in the Florida House of Representatives, representing Jacksonville, from 1868 to 1873 and again in 1879. He was a leading politician in Jacksonville during the Reconstruction Era and a member of the City Council; his group "once [1872] had so many representatives in the city government that the entire form of government was changed by an executive act in Tallahassee".

In 1893, a photograph documents that he was the president of Edward Waters College.

His son John R. Scott Jr., earned a Bachelor of Divinity, was also a minister of the African Methodist Episcopal Church (and secretary of its conference, 1889), a member of the Florida Legislature, and a professor of homiletics (preaching) at Edward Waters College.

See also
African-American officeholders during and following the Reconstruction era

References

External links
 

African Methodist Episcopal Church clergy
Members of the Florida House of Representatives
Edward Waters College faculty
African-American politicians during the Reconstruction Era
History of Jacksonville, Florida
Politicians from Jacksonville, Florida
19th-century American slaves
1840s births
1929 deaths
Year of birth uncertain
African-American state legislators in Florida
Edward Waters College
African-American history in Jacksonville, Florida